The 1984 United States House of Representatives elections in Texas occurred on November 6, 1984, to elect the members of the state of Texas's delegation to the United States House of Representatives. Texas had twenty-seven seats in the House, apportioned according to the 1980 United States Census.

Texas underwent mid-decade redistricting as a result of the District Court case Upham v. Seamon. The U.S. Department of Justice objected to the boundaries of District 15 and District 27 adopted by the Texas Legislature in 1981 under preclearance established by Section 5 of the Voting Rights Act of 1965. The court's modified districts were used in 1982, and the Legislature modified other districts in 1983, keeping the court-modified districts in place.

These elections occurred simultaneously with the United States Senate elections of 1984, the United States House elections in other states, the presidential election, and various state and local elections.

Democrats maintained their majority of U.S. House seats from Texas, but they lost four seats to the Republicans, who rode the coattails of president Ronald Reagan's re-election.

Overview

Congressional Districts

District 1 
Incumbent Democrat Sam B. Hall ran for re-election unopposed.

District 2 
Incumbent Democrat Charlie Wilson ran for re-election. He faced four primary opponents but managed to avoid a runoff with 54 percent of the vote.

District 3 
Incumbent Republican Steve Bartlett ran for re-election.

District 4 
Incumbent Democrat Ralph Hall ran for re-election.

District 5 
Incumbent Democrat John Wiley Bryant ran for re-election unopposed.

District 6 
Incumbent Democrat Phil Gramm resigned after being removed from his seat on the House Budget Committee by Democratic leadership. He subsequently switched his party affiliation to the Republican Party and ran for his old seat in the ensuing special election. He had been planning to switch parties even before this occurred. Ronald Reagan had won the district in 1980, and Gramm's opponents cast the race as a referendum on Reganomics. Gramm won the race outright, avoiding a runoff and returning to Congress as a Republican. He retired at the end of his term to run for U.S. Senator.

District 7 
Incumbent Republican Bill Archer ran for re-election.

District 8 
Incumbent Republican Jack Fields ran for re-election.

District 9 
Incumbent Democrat Jack Brooks ran for re-election.

District 10 
Incumbent Democrat J. J. Pickle ran for re-election unopposed.

District 11 
Incumbent Democrat Marvin Leath ran for re-election unopposed.

District 12 
Incumbent Democrat Jim Wright ran for re-election unopposed.

District 13 
Incumbent Democrat Jack Hightower ran for re-election.

District 14 
Incumbent Democrat Bill Patman ran for re-election.

District 15 
Incumbent Democrat Kika de la Garza ran for re-election unopposed.

District 16 
Incumbent Democrat Ronald D. Coleman ran for re-election.

District 17 
Incumbent Democrat Charles Stenholm ran for re-election unopposed.

District 18 
Incumbent Democrat Mickey Leland ran for re-election.

District 19 
Incumbent Democrat Kent Hance retired to run for U.S. Senator.

District 20 
Incumbent Democrat Henry B. González ran for re-election unopposed.

District 21 
Incumbent Republican Tom Loeffler ran for re-election.

District 22 
Incumbent Republican Ron Paul retired to run for U.S. Senator.

District 23 
Incumbent Democrat Abraham Kazen ran for re-election. He lost in the Democratic Primary to Albert Bustamante. Kazen was one of only three incumbent members of congress to lose a primary in 1984.

District 24 
Incumbent Democrat Martin Frost ran for re-election.

District 25 
Incumbent Democrat Michael A. Andrews ran for re-election.

District 26 
Incumbent Democrat Tom Vandergriff ran for re-election. Mid-decade redistricting had made this district slightly more favorable to Democrats. The previous iteration of this district, which Vandergriff narrowly won in 1982, would have given Ronald Reagan 67 percent of the vote had it existed in 1980.

District 27 
Incumbent Democrat Solomon Ortiz ran for re-election.

References

1984
Texas
1984 Texas elections